Jeroen Tarquinis Cornelis Duyster (born 27 August 1966 in Amsterdam, North Holland) is a former coxswain from the Netherlands, who won a gold medal with the Holland Acht (Holland Eights) as a cox at the 1996 Summer Olympics in Atlanta, Georgia. He is the older brother of former Dutch field hockey international Willemijn Duyster, who won the bronze medal at the same Olympic tournament.

References
  Dutch Olympic Committee

1966 births
Living people
Dutch male rowers
Rowers at the 1996 Summer Olympics
Olympic rowers of the Netherlands
Olympic gold medalists for the Netherlands
Rowers from Amsterdam
Coxswains (rowing)
Olympic medalists in rowing
Medalists at the 1996 Summer Olympics
20th-century Dutch people
21st-century Dutch people